The Carleton Bridge (or Carlton Bridge) is a historic wooden covered bridge that carries Carlton Road over the South Branch Ashuelot River in East Swanzey, New Hampshire.  The bridge was built in 1869, and is the region's only surviving example of a 19th-century Queenspost truss bridge.  The bridge was listed on the National Register of Historic Places in 1975.

Description and history
The Carleton Bridge is located in central eastern Swanzey, in a rural setting on Carlton Road east of New Hampshire Route 32. Carlton Road is one of the main routes connecting Swanzey village with East Swanzey. Its exterior is sheathed in vertical board siding and is topped by a gabled roof. Its trusses have been reinforced with iron tie rods and other metal elements.

The bridge was built in 1869 on a site that is believed to have had a bridge since 1789.  It is believed to be the only example of a Queenspost truss bridge in southern New Hampshire.  This truss method is quite old, and is based on techniques used for building large structures such as churches and barns.

See also

List of New Hampshire covered bridges
List of bridges on the National Register of Historic Places in New Hampshire
National Register of Historic Places listings in Cheshire County, New Hampshire

Notes

References

External links
 Carlton Covered Bridge on Flickr

Covered bridges on the National Register of Historic Places in New Hampshire
Wooden bridges in New Hampshire
Tourist attractions in Cheshire County, New Hampshire
Bridges in Cheshire County, New Hampshire
National Register of Historic Places in Cheshire County, New Hampshire
Swanzey, New Hampshire
Road bridges on the National Register of Historic Places in New Hampshire
Queen post truss bridges in the United States